This is a list of candidates of the 1944 New South Wales state election. The election was held on 27 May 1944.

Retiring members

Democratic
 Herbert FitzSimons (Lane Cove)

Country
 Arthur Budd (Byron)

Legislative Assembly
Sitting members are shown in bold text. Successful candidates are highlighted in the relevant colour.

See also
 Results of the 1944 New South Wales state election
Members of the New South Wales Legislative Assembly, 1944–1947

References
 

1944